Arturo Peyrot (1908–1993) was an Italian artist, painter and writer. He was born in Rome, Italy in 1908, where he studied at the Rome University of Fine Arts. 

Arturo Peyrot graduated in 1932, when he winned the Fossati award as their best student. 

Peyrot was Giorgio Morandi's disciple. 

In 1937 he obtained the Dante Alighieri scholarship to attend the High Culture courses in Rhodes and Athens. 

He won the Agostini Award in Terni, in 1947. 

In 1950 he moved to Paris and in 1952 he moved to Spain, with a grant from the Spanish Ministry of Foreigns Affairs, where he settled permanently and where he developed most of his artistic activity.

He has to his credit a wide list of awards, more than 40 exhibitions in both Europe and America, and paintings, murals and stained glass windows in numerous Italian and Spanish institutions. As an example, Peyrot did some of the frescoes in the Great Hall of the University of Rome.

His work evolved from the avant-garde and, after an abstract phase, he slowly returned to figurative art with a very personal style.

Another facet of his is collaborating as a cartoonist in Italian and Spanish magazines and newspapers, including “Abc” and “Blanco y Negro”.

Arturo Peyrot passed away in Madrid, Spain in 1993.

References

External links
 Ask Art the Artists Bluebook
 Arturo Peyrot, pintor
 Catálogo de Concursos Nacionales, España 1967

Italian muralists
20th-century Italian painters
Italian male painters
Italian expatriates in Spain
1908 births
1993 deaths
20th-century Italian male artists

